The Hamlin Robinson School is an independent school in Seattle offering a specialized program specifically for students with dyslexia and related language difficulties. The school was founded in 1983.

History
For over 30 years, the Hamlin Robinson School has been the only non-profit school in Washington that specializes in a program specifically for children with dyslexia and other language-related learning issues. In 1991 HRS was accredited by the Pacific Northwest Association of Independent Schools.

The school was founded in 1983 by the Slingerland Institute for Literacy and the Robinson family, in memory of Hamlin Robinson, the first board chair of the Slingerland Institute for Literacy. The school has been operating independently since the fall of 1986.

The school has grown from its first class of eleven children to a student body of over 200 in first through eighth grade. Nearly 1,000 students have attended Hamlin Robinson since its doors opened in 1983.

On May 5, 2010, the Seattle School Board approved the lease of the T.T. Minor building to the Hamlin Robinson School.

On October 8, 2012, HRS announced that it would be moving to a permanent location, and on September 23, 2013, it was announced that the site would be in the North Beacon Hill neighborhood.

The School moved to its permanent home on June 15, 2015. This new building is specifically designed for HRS's unique program.

Facts and Figures
 Head of School: Stacy Turner
 Faculty: 21 classroom teachers; 6 resident teachers, full-time art, music, and PE teachers; Librarian; Drama teacher; Technology Specialist; 2 Academic Aides; Counselor; Speech & Language Pathologist 
 Student Enrollment: 280 students in grades 1 through 8
 Average Class Size: 13
 Extra-curricular Activities: After-school clubs rotate each trimester; offerings include cross-country, ultimate frisbee, video production, tae kwon do, guitar, stop action video, yogalates, and digital photography
 Accreditation: Hamlin Robinson School is approved by the State of Washington as an independent, not-for-profit, coeducational day school for primary through high school aged students. HRS is accredited by the Northwest Association of Independent Schools, the National Association of Independent Schools, and the Northwest Accreditation Commission.
 Tuition and Fees 2018-19: $22,152 (grades 1-5), $24,232 (grades 6-8) 
 Financial Aid: Approximately 20% of families receive financial assistance from HRS.

References

External links

1983 establishments in Washington (state)
Central District, Seattle
Educational institutions established in 1983
Private elementary schools in Washington (state)
Private middle schools in Washington (state)
Schools in Seattle